There are over 20,000 Grade II* listed buildings in England. This page is a list of these buildings in the district of Eden in Cumbria.

Eden

|}

Notes

External links

Lists of listed buildings in Cumbria
 
Lists of Grade II* listed buildings in Cumbria
Eden District